León María Guerrero may refer to:
León María Guerrero (botanist) (1853–1935), Filipino botanist, revolutionary, and politician
León María Guerrero (diplomat) (1915–1982), Filipino diplomat and novelist